(Yoshiko & Yuriko) is a 2011 Japanese biographical drama directed by Sachi Hamano.

Plot
Set in 1924, the film follows the relationship between author Yuriko Miyamoto and openly lesbian Russian literature translator Yoshiko Yuasa.

Cast and characters
Nahana as Yoshiko Yuasa 
Hitomi Toi as Yuriko Miyamoto (née Chūjō)
Ren Osugi as Shigeru Araki
Kazuko Yoshiyuki as Yoshie Chūjō
Yoriko Douguchi as Yaeko Nogami
Kaho Aso as Sei Kitamura
Hisako Okata as Un Chūjō
Tadahiko Hirano as Seiichiro Chūjō

Development
Based partially on the 1928 semi-autobiographical novel Nobuko (伸子 / ) by Yuriko Miyamoto  and the 1990 non-fiction novel Yuriko, dasuvidāniya: Yuasa Yoshiko no seishun by Hitomi Sawabe, the little-known true story of the relationship between the two women in the early 20th century was produced in 2010, with filming completed on October 22, 2010.

Home media
The Region 2 DVD of Yuriko, Dasvidaniya (百合子, ダスヴィダーニヤ : Yoshiko & Yuriko) was released in Japan in 2013 by Kabushiki Kaisha Tantansha.

See also
List of LGBT-related films
List of LGBT-related films directed by women

References

Further reading

External links
  (in Japanese) (Archive)
 
  Yoshiko & Yuriko 百合子、ダスヴィダーニヤ at Japanese Film Database
  Yoshiko & Yuriko at Women's Action Network

2011 films
2011 LGBT-related films
Biographical films about writers
Female bisexuality in film
Films directed by Sachi Hamano
Japanese drama films
2010s Japanese-language films
Japanese LGBT-related films
Lesbian-related films
2010s Japanese films